The Indian Institute of Information Technology Design and Manufacturing, Kurnool (IIITDM Kurnool), also initially known as Indian Institute of Information Technology, Kurnool (IIIT Kurnool), is a technical education institute in the field of Information Technology established by MHRD, Government of India in 2015. The institute started functioning at its permanent campus of in Kurnool.

History
IIITDM Kurnool was established in 2015 by the Ministry of Human Resource Development (MHRD) as part as the government obligation under the Andhra Pradesh Reorganisation Act, 2014. The Indian Institutes of Information Technology (Amendment) Act, 2017 granted Institutes of National Importance (INI) status to the institute in August 2017. The Mission of IIITDM Kurnool is "To become a center of excellence pioneering in education, research & development, and leaders in design & manufacturing", the Vision is "To become a leading institute of higher learning in Information Technology enabled design & manufacturing to create technologies and technologists befitting the industries globally" and charter is "To carry out advanced research and development activities in design and manufacturing technologies, both on its own and on sponsorship basis for the industry".

Admission 
Admission to the undergraduate program is based on the All India Rank obtained in the JEE Main examination conducted by National Testing Agency(NTA).
This institute Also Offers PhD program And also  M.tech Courses through Gate 2020 Rank.

References

Kurnool
Universities and colleges in Kurnool district
Kurnool
2015 establishments in Andhra Pradesh
Educational institutions established in 2015